Aneta Regina Konieczna née Pastuszka (born 11 May 1978, in Krosno Odrzańskie) is a Polish sprint canoer who has competed since the mid-1990s. Competing in five Summer Olympics, she won three medals in the K-2 500 m event with one silver (2008) and two bronzes (2000, 2004).

Konieczna has also been successful at the ICF Canoe Sprint World Championships, winning sixteen medals. This includes two golds (K-2 500 m: 1999, K-4 1000 m: 2002), five silvers (K-2 200 m: 1999, 2001, 2002; K-2 500 m: 2001, K-4 500 m: 2005, and seven bronzes (K-1 500 m: 2003, K-2 200 m: 2003, K-4 200 m: 1999, 2001, 2003; K-4 500 m: 1999, 2007, 2010).

For her sport achievements, she received: 
 Golden Cross of Merit in 2000; 
 Knight's Cross of the Order of Polonia Restituta (5th Class) in 2004; 
 Officer's Cross of the Order of Polonia Restituta (4th Class) in 2008.

References

External links 
 
 

1978 births
Living people
People from Krosno Odrzańskie
Canoeists at the 1996 Summer Olympics
Canoeists at the 2000 Summer Olympics
Canoeists at the 2004 Summer Olympics
Canoeists at the 2008 Summer Olympics
Canoeists at the 2012 Summer Olympics
Olympic canoeists of Poland
Olympic silver medalists for Poland
Olympic bronze medalists for Poland
Polish female canoeists
Olympic medalists in canoeing
Knights of the Order of Polonia Restituta
Officers of the Order of Polonia Restituta
Recipients of the Gold Cross of Merit (Poland)
ICF Canoe Sprint World Championships medalists in kayak
Medalists at the 2008 Summer Olympics
Medalists at the 2004 Summer Olympics
Sportspeople from Lubusz Voivodeship
Medalists at the 2000 Summer Olympics